Mojiang Hani Autonomous County is an autonomous county under the jurisdiction of Pu'er City, in the south of Yunnan Province, China.

Administrative divisions
In the present, Mojiang Hani Autonomous County has 12 towns, 2 townships and 1 ethnic township.
12 towns

2 townships
 Longtan
 Naha

1 ethnic township
 Yi Mengnong

Demographics 

There was a total of 210,628 ethnic Hani in Mojiang County as of 2006. Hani subgroups in Mojiang County include the following, with 2006 population estimates (Jiang, et al. 2009:3) and language classifications (Mojiang County Ethnic Gazetteer 2007:22).

Bi-Ka languages
 Biyue 碧约 (63,359 people)
 Kaduo 卡多 (62,696 people)
 Ximoluo 西摩洛 (14,711 people)
 Kabie 卡别 (1,243 people)
Hao-Bai languages
 Haoni 豪尼 (29,915 people)
 Baihong 白宏 (27,052 people)
 Lami 腊米 (3,105 people)
 Amu 阿木 (7,050 people)
Qiedi 切弟 (1,497 people) (not classified)

The Budu and Bukong are also found in Mojiang County.

 Budu 布都 (17,498 people)
 Bukong 布孔 (14,106 people), including in Niangpuzhai 娘浦寨, Mengli Village 勐里村, Longba Township 龙坝乡

According to the Mojiang County Gazetteer (2002:640), ethnic Bulang, who numbered 2,968 individuals as of 1993, are found in the townships of Jingxing 景星, Xinwu 新抚, and Tongguan 通关. The Bulang of Mojiang County speak Va, an Angkuic language.

In Mojiang County, ethnic Yao are found in Yaojia 瑶家 and Guangshan 光山 of Manxing Village 曼兴村, Wenwu Township 文武乡.

Transport 
 China National Highway 213

Climate

References

Notes 
 Jiang Ying [蒋颖], Cui Xia [崔霞], Qiao Xiang [乔翔]. 2009. A study of Ximoluo [西摩洛语研究]. Beijing: Ethnic Publishing House [民族出版社].
 Yang Hong [杨洪], Zhang Hong [张红]. 2010. Demographics and current situations of Hani subgroups in Mojiang County [墨江哈尼族自治县哈尼支系与人口现状调查研究]. Journal of Honghe University [红河学院学报]. Vol. 8, No. 3. Jun. 2010. DOI:10.13963/j.cnki.hhuxb.2010.03.028

External links 

 Mojiang County official website 

County-level divisions of Pu'er City
Hani autonomous counties